Maoping is an ethnic town for Hui people, currently under the administration of Zhen'an County, Shaanxi, China. , it has seven villages under its administration.

References 

Township-level divisions of Shaanxi
Zhen'an County
Ethnic townships of the People's Republic of China